The  in Hashimoto, Wakayama, Japan is a National Treasure of Japan. It is a bronze mirror cast with 48 Chinese characters around the fifth century. It is an important artifact for the research in Japanese archaeology and Old Japanese language.

Inscriptions
The mirror says 
There are a few unclear points, but a tentative translation is "In the eighth month of a gui-wei year, in the reign of the great king, when the prince Wooto was at the Osisaka Palace, Sima, wishing for longevity, sent two persons to make this mirror from 200 han of brand-new and fine bronze." The year gui-wei likely corresponds to 443 or 503.

According to one prevailing opinion, the prince Wooto can be identified as the prince Oohodo, a grandson of Emperor Ōjin and a brother of Oshisaka-no-Oonakatsuhime (Emperor Ingyō's consort). Another theory holds that Wooto is Ōdo-no-Ookimi (Emperor Keitai). He may be a great-grandson (or a younger brother) of the prince Oohodo. If the gui-wei year corresponds to 503, Shima is presumed King Muryeong of Baekje, whose name is recorded on his tomb as : pronounced Sama in Korean, and Shima in Japanese.

On the basis of this ancient inscription, Korean scholar Kim Woon-Hoe theorizes a fraternal relationship between Emperor Keitai of Japan and King Muryeong of Baekje. A mirror was excavated from the tomb of King Muryeong. It is similar to the mirrors of Emperor Nintoku and Emperor Keitai. In the ancient Buyeo kingdom, the bronze mirror represented the king.

See also
 Seven-Branched Sword

Notes

References
 

National Treasures of Japan
Baekje
Old Japanese texts
Bronze mirrors